is a private university in Japan. The campus is located in Kamogawa, Chiba. It opened to the public in April 2012.

References

Private universities and colleges in Japan
2012 establishments in Japan
Educational institutions established in 2012
Kamogawa, Chiba